The 2002–03 NBA season  was the 14th season for the Orlando Magic in the National Basketball Association. During the off-season, the Magic signed free agent All-Star forward Shawn Kemp. However, Grant Hill only played just 29 games due to his continuing ankle injuries, and Horace Grant only played just five games with a sore left knee, and was released to free agency after feuding with head coach Doc Rivers. At midseason, the Magic traded Mike Miller to the Memphis Grizzlies in exchange for rookies Drew Gooden and Gordan Giriček. Despite the absence of Hill and Grant, and a 24–26 record at the All-Star break, the Magic finished fourth in the Atlantic Division with a 42–40 record.

Tracy McGrady won his first scoring title leading the league in scoring with 32.1 points, 6.5 rebounds, 5.5 assists and 1.7 steals per game per game, as he was named to the All-NBA First Team, and selected for the 2003 NBA All-Star Game. McGrady also finished in fourth place in Most Valuable Player voting with 4 first-place votes. In addition, Hill averaged 14.5 points, 7.1 rebounds and 4.2 assists per game, while Pat Garrity provided the team with 10.7 points per game, Darrell Armstrong contributed 9.4 points, 3.9 assists and 1.6 steals per game, and Kemp provided with 6.8 points and 5.7 rebounds per game. Gooden was named to the NBA All-Rookie First Team, while Giriček was named to the NBA All-Rookie Second Team.

In the Eastern Conference First Round of the playoffs, the Magic took a 3–1 series lead over the top-seeded Detroit Pistons, but went on to lose the next three games, thus the series. Following the season, Kemp retired, while Armstrong signed as a free agent with the New Orleans Hornets, and Grant re-signed with the Los Angeles Lakers.

After the playoff defeat, the Magic entered a state of rebuilding and did not return to the playoffs until 2007.

Draft picks

Roster

Roster Notes
 Small forward Grant Hill played 29 games (his last game being on January 16, 2003) but missed the rest of the season and the playoffs due to having left ankle problems. He was placed on the injured list on January 18, 2003 and underwent season-ending surgery in March 2003.

Regular season

Season standings

z – clinched division title
y – clinched division title
x – clinched playoff spot

Record vs. opponents

Game log

Playoffs

|- align="center" bgcolor="#ccffcc"
| 1
| April 20
| @ Detroit
| W 99–94
| Tracy McGrady (43)
| Drew Gooden (15)
| Jacque Vaughn (6)
| The Palace of Auburn Hills21,261
| 1–0
|- align="center" bgcolor="#ffcccc"
| 2
| April 23
| @ Detroit
| L 77–89
| Tracy McGrady (46)
| Drew Gooden (11)
| Jacque Vaughn (6)
| The Palace of Auburn Hills22,076
| 1–1
|- align="center" bgcolor="#ccffcc"
| 3
| April 25
| Detroit
| W 89–80
| Tracy McGrady (29)
| Gooden, McGrady (7)
| Darrell Armstrong (8)
| TD Waterhouse Centre17,283
| 2–1
|- align="center" bgcolor="#ccffcc"
| 4
| April 27
| Detroit
| W 100–92
| Tracy McGrady (27)
| Drew Gooden (13)
| Tracy McGrady (9)
| TD Waterhouse Centre17,283
| 3–1
|- align="center" bgcolor="#ffcccc"
| 5
| April 30
| @ Detroit
| L 67–98
| Tracy McGrady (19)
| Drew Gooden (15)
| Tracy McGrady (4)
| The Palace of Auburn Hills22,076
| 3–2
|- align="center" bgcolor="#ffcccc"
| 6
| May 2
| Detroit
| L 88–103
| Tracy McGrady (37)
| Drew Gooden (12)
| Tracy McGrady (5)
| TD Waterhouse Centre16,909
| 3–3
|- align="center" bgcolor="#ffcccc"
| 7
| May 4
| @ Detroit
| L 93–108
| Tracy McGrady (21)
| Drew Gooden (17)
| Tracy McGrady (6)
| The Palace of Auburn Hills22,076
| 3–4
|-

Player statistics

Season
-5 PPG

Playoffs

Awards and honors
Tracy McGrady – All-NBA 1st Team, Scoring Champion, All-Star
Drew Gooden – All-Rookie 1st Team
Gordan Giriček – All-Rookie 2nd Team

Transactions

Overview

Player Transactions Citation:

References

Orlando Magic seasons
2002 in sports in Florida
2003 in sports in Florida